Gushegu-Karaga District is a former district that was located in Northern Region, Ghana. Originally created as an ordinary district assembly in 1988, which was created from the former East Dagomba District Council. However on 28 June 2012, it was split off into two new districts: Gushegu District (capital: Gushegu) and Karaga District (capital: Karaga). The district assembly was located in the northeast part of Northern Region and had Gushegu as its capital town.

See also
 
 GhanaDistricts.com

References

Districts of the Northern Region (Ghana)